Phiala longilinea is a moth in the family Eupterotidae. It was described by Emilio Berio in 1939. It is found in Eritrea.

References

Endemic fauna of Eritrea
Moths described in 1939
Eupterotinae